Nikolay Noev (born 24 February 1988, in the Sakha Republic) is a Yakut Russian-born naturalized Tajikistani freestyle wrestler. He competed in the freestyle 55 kg event at the 2012 Summer Olympics and was defeated by Radoslav Velikov in the qualification round.

References

External links
 

1988 births
Living people
Sportspeople from Sakha
Tajikistani male sport wrestlers
Olympic wrestlers of Tajikistan
Wrestlers at the 2012 Summer Olympics
Wrestlers at the 2014 Asian Games
Asian Games competitors for Tajikistan